Serra is a former civil parish in the municipality of Tomar, Portugal. In 2013, the parish merged into the new parish Serra e Junceira. The population is 1299 (2001), the area 33.52 km², with a density of 38.8/km².

References

Former parishes of Tomar